Passive income is a type of unearned income that is acquired automatically with minimal labor to earn or maintain. It is often combined with another source of income, such as a side job. In the United States, the IRS divides income into three categories: active income, passive income, and portfolio income. Passive income, as an acquired income, is the result of capital growth or is related to the tax deduction mechanism, and is taxable.

It is called progressive passive income when the earner expends little effort to grow the income. Examples of passive income include rental income and business activities in which the earner does not materially participate. Some jurisdictions' taxing authorities, such as the Internal Revenue Service in the United States of America, distinguish passive income from other forms of income, such as earnings from regular or contractual employment, and may tax it differently.

It can take a long period of work and accumulation before passive income can be earned. Passive income can be a way of creating financial independence and early retirement, because the beneficiary will receive an income regardless of whether they are materially active in the activity creating the revenue. 

Passive income is not always a lump sum payment, like an inheritance or proceeds from the sale of an asset such as a home or stock. It can also come from a source that has a likely continuity over time but is not guaranteed. Some passive incomes may last for several years, or even centuries across generations. Examples of these longer term sources of passive income can include: property; dividends; debt; and other appreciating asset classes.

Just because one person considers a source of income to be passive, does not mean it was the case in creation of the wealth/revenue/asset value increase. Whilst to the end beneficiary the income may be passive, there can often be effort expended by others to generate value, such as renovations to modernize and enhance a building that increases rental income and/or creates an increase in the property's value. The degree of passivity of an income depends on the perspective of the person concerned. What one person sees as passive income may be the active income to another person.

Generally speaking, high-income groups have more diversified sources of revenue leading to a higher probability to have access to hidden income, and therefore passive income can also be a good excuse for tax avoidance by transferring active income into the passive one. The loophole has resulted in a large amount of "passive income" such as income from property transfer and property leasing, and even "earned income" such as income from non-regularly occurring labor remuneration, which to a large extent has not been taxed to the fullest extent. As a result, there is voice from the public that personal tax has been degraded to a "wage tax" aimed at exploited middle income working class.

Types of income 
As mentioned above, passive income is, in general, income that requires little to no work to produce and maintain. Active income is earned income including all taxable income and wages the earner receives for working. Active income includes wages, self-employment income, and material participation in an S corporation or partnership. In other words, active income refers to income earned by performing a service or some kind of work. Income from business is considered active in case that the owner satisfies the requirements for material participation (which is based on many factors, mainly on hours worked). Portfolio income is derived from investments such as dividends, interest, capital gains, and some royalties.

Types of income are defined differently among the states and countries and can be taxed differently, depending on the law at the time. For example, portfolio income is often taxed at lower rates than active income in the USA.

Classification based on income source 
According to the US tax code, it does not specifically define income, but lists the various income items. The basic concept of the US federal personal income tax is the gross income, which is defined by the IRS as all income from any source, except for those excluded by law. There are four types of income depending on the income source:

 income derived from labor, also known as active income, which is income derived from labor provided by an individual in return for remuneration, or income derived from the conduct of a business. Common types of income from active working include: wages, salaries, tips, bonuses and commissions; income from an active activity in a trade or business; income from the provision of labor; and income from illegal activities.
 income from capital, also known as passive income, includes investments and the sale, trade or other disposal of invested assets. Common types of non-working income include: interest income; dividend income; income from leasing or royalty-related activities; annuity income; income from partnerships, S corporations etc.; and income from the sale of assets that can generate the five categories of income listed above. 
 income constituted by a transfer from another person. Common types of income derived from transfers from others include: prizes and awards; unemployment compensation; social security benefits; and alimony received. 
 presumptive income. Common presumptive income includes: loans at below-market interest rates; expenses borne by others; and low-cost purchases.

The four categories of income are not designed to differentiate tax rate, but rather to introduce a credit for active work.

Classification based on the deficit of passive activities 
In the US tax system, various types of income can be classified under the negative activity loss rules as follows:
 
 First, portfolio income. Portfolio income includes: unearned income from dividends, interest, royalties, annuities and other assets held as investments; income from the sale of assets that generate portfolio income.
 Second, active income. Active income includes: wages and salaries; other income from transactions or operations in which the taxpayer is substantially involved.
 Third, passive income. Passive income includes income from transactions or operations in which the taxpayer is not actively and fully involved, for example, ordinary rental income. However, the following rental activities are not considered negative activities: hotel rooms, hospital housing, car rentals, video rentals, clothing rentals, golf course fees, tool rentals, car dealerships renting cars, and cable TV rentals. In addition, income from limited partnerships is also considered negative income.

Investment portfolios and passive income are also covered by the personal income tax rules regarding the earned income tax credit.

United States 

The United States Internal Revenue Service categorizes income as active income, passive income, or portfolio income. It defines passive income as only coming from two sources, or "passive activities": rental activity or "trade or business activities in which you do not materially participate." Other financial and government institutions also recognize it as an income obtained as a result of capital growth or in relation to negative gearing. Passive income is usually taxable.

Passive activities 
According to IRS, there are two kinds of passive activities.

 Rental activities, one may even materially participate in them unless he is a real estate professional.
 Trade or business activities in which one does not materially participate during the year.
Portfolio income (interest, dividends, royalties, gains on stocks and bonds) is considered passive income by some analysts. However, the IRS does not generally consider portfolio income as passive. Thus it would be wise to turn to a tax professional on that subject.

Also self-charged interest can be included in passive income "if the loan proceeds are used in a passive activity". Self-charged interest income usually refers to loans between you and a partnership or S corporation in which you had a direct or indirect ownership interest at any time during their tax year (this applies for both loans you made to the partnership or S corporation and loans that were made to you).

In some cases, royalties could be put in the category of passive income. Royalties are payments made by one company (the licensee) to another company or person (the licensor) for the right to use the latter's intellectual property (book, music, video) or patent. However, the Internal Revenue Service only considers royalties passive income when they are "not derived in the ordinary course of a trade or business."

Silent partner 
Passive income also includes earnings from other business in which a person is not actively involved. An example could be silent partner. A silent partner is an individual who does not have any role in company and whose participation in a partnership is limited to providing capital to the business (that is why they are sometimes called limited partners). A silent partner earns a passive income since he gets an agreed percentage of the gross profits on a regular basis.

Rental activities 
In order to be considered a rental activity, tangible property is used by customers and the gross income from the activity represents amounts paid mainly for the use of the property. Activity isn’t a rental activity if any of the following apply:

 The average period of customer use is:
 7 days or less
 30 days or less and significant personal services were provided (cleaning of common areas or repairing property do not count as personal services)
 Extraordinary personal services are provided, i.e. they are performed by individuals and the customers' use of the property is incidental in terms of receiving the services
 The rental is incidental to a non-rental activity. In other words, if the main purpose of holding the property is to attain a gain from its appreciation (and also applies the condition that the gross rental income from the property is less than 2% of fair market value).

Trade or business activities 
A trade or business activity is an activity that involves running a trade or business, is conducted in expectation of starting a trade or business or involves research or experimental expenditures.

Europe 
It would be complicated to state one conclusion about the passive income and the taxation of this type of income in Europe. In fact, there is no word defined as "passive income" by the European Commission. In addition, the European Union itself has no taxation powers. Every country levies different taxes on activities that are defined above as "passive".

The Organisation for Economic Co-operation and Development (OECD) 
The Common Reporting Standard (CRS) does not define passive income as well. Each jurisdiction can define the items included in the list of passive income in its own way in accordance with domestic rules. However, the CRS provides a list of items that should generally be considered as passive income and should guide the countries.

Income should be characterized as passive if it contains the portion of gross income that consists of:

 dividends
 interest (or income equivalent to interest)
 rents and royalties (that are not made in the active conduct of a business )
 annuities; the excess of gains over losses from the sale or exchange of Financial Assets 
 the excess of gains over losses from transactions in any Financial Assets
 the excess of foreign currency gains over foreign currency losses
 net income from swaps; a swap is a contract between two parties to exchange cashflows or other financial instruments for a certain period.

China 
China currently adopts a proportional tax rate of 20% for passive income and unearned income, which does not play the role of regulating the income distribution gap between active income and passive income as some expects argued. Specifically, the relative tax rates on these two incomes, with the former one being subject to a progressive marginal tax rate of up to 45% on larger amounts of income, while the later income, particularly capital gains, is only subject to a proportional tax rate of 20%, which is unfair on a horizontal basis and does not have the effect of regulating excessive income.

Sources 
There are more types of passive income than is shown in this article. In any case, it is preferable to consult with financial advisor first.

 Bank deposit
It is one of the most popular and simplest ways to gain passive income. A person gives a certain amount of money to a bank and takes interest every month.
 Securities 
The profit, created by security, is in general inversely proportional to the risk it holds. 
 Bonds 
Bonds are debt securities issued by the state or company for gaining investments. By purchasing a bond, a person is lending savings to the issuer for a specified period. In return, he receives income at the very end of the bond validity period, or he can also earn so-called coupon income.
 Dividend stocks
It is a reliable way to generate income passively. However, it is important to mention the research to find stocks with desirable risk/income ratio.

See also 

 Cash flow
 Capital gains
 Economic rent
 Profit
 Property income
 Rent seeking
 Surplus value
 Unearned income
 Net income

Notes

References

External links 

 Passive income, Investopedia
 ASIC's MoneySmart website

Profit
Income